Mikhail Paskalides (also Michael Paschalidis) was a Greek athlete.  He competed at the 1908 Summer Olympics in London.

In the 100 metres, Paskalides took fourth place in his first round heat and was eliminated from further competition.  He took second in his two-man heat of the 200 metres with a time of 24.0 seconds and was eliminated from that competition as well.

References

Sources
 
 
 

Year of birth missing
Year of death missing
Athletes (track and field) at the 1908 Summer Olympics
Olympic athletes of Greece
Greek male sprinters
20th-century Greek people